The 1912–13 Irish Cup was the 33rd edition of the premier knock-out cup competition in Irish football. 

Linfield won the tournament for the 10th time, defeating Glentoran 2–0 in the final.

Results

First round

|}

Replay

|}

Second replay

|}

Quarter-finals

|}

Replay

|}

Semifinals

|}

Final

References

External links
 Northern Ireland Cup Finals. Rec.Sport.Soccer Statistics Foundation (RSSSF)

Irish Cup seasons
1912–13 domestic association football cups
1912–13 in Irish association football